Tatiara District Council is a local government area located in south-eastern South Australia. The name Tatiara is said to mean "the good country", a phrase which dates back to the area's first inhabitants, the Bodaruwitj people. The district's economy is based primarily on agriculture, with cereal crops such as wheat, barley and oats and with livestock such as sheep, cattle and pigs prominent.

History
The Tatiara country was opened up by European settlers in the 1840s for grazing purposes, with the township of Bordertown established in 1852, slowly expanding as more graziers moved to the area.

After significant growth in the area, the District Council of Tatiara was formed in 1876 as constituting the whole of the Hundred of Tatiara.

In 1884, a neighbouring council was established, the District Council of Wirrega; however this was short-lived, and in 1888 it was amalgamated into the Tatiara District Council.

In the years following, a number of new towns including Keith and Padthaway were established, and grew to their current sizes.

Geography

It includes the towns and localities of Bangham, Bordertown, Bordertown South, Brimbago, Buckingham, Cannawigara, Carew, Custon, Keith, Kongal, Laffer, Lowan Vale, Makin, McCallum, Mount Charles, Mundulla, Mundulla West, Shaugh, Swede Flat, Padthaway, Petherick, Pine Hill, Pooginagoric, Senior, Sherwood, Western Flat, Willalooka, Wirrega and Wolseley, and part of Ngarkat.

Facilities
The district has most of the usual facilities including a range of facilities for tourists and travellers. Accommodation is available in the major towns in the form of hotels and caravan parks with a variety of shops such as supermarkets, bakeries and roadhouses for supplies.

The district possesses a range of sporting facilities including a golf course, basketball and tennis courts and a football and cricket oval, with clubs established for those sports. Health facilities include a hospital and dentist, with the area also having a primary and high school.

Councillors

See also
List of parks and gardens in rural South Australia

References

External links
Tatiara District Council Site Accessed 12 May 2013.
Tatiara District Council > Tourism Page Accessed 12 May 2013.

Local government areas of South Australia
Limestone Coast